Liu Qinghong (born 1 April 1996) is a Chinese long distance runner. She competed in the women's marathon at the 2017 World Championships in Athletics.

References

External links

1996 births
Living people
Chinese female long-distance runners
Chinese female marathon runners
World Athletics Championships athletes for China
Place of birth missing (living people)
People from Linyi
Runners from Shandong